The Old Botanical Garden may refer to:

 The Alter Botanischer Garten Hamburg, in the German city of Hamburg
 The Old Botanical Garden of Göttingen University, in the German city of Göttingen
 The Old Botanical Garden, Kiel, in the German city of Kiel
 The Old Botanical Garden, Zürich, in the Swiss city of Zürich